The 50 kilometre cross-country skiing event was part of the cross-country skiing at the 1928 Winter Olympics programme. It was the second appearance of the event. The competition was held on Tuesday, 14 February 1928. Forty-one cross-country skiers from eleven nations competed.

Medalists

Results

Hedlund's margin of victory is the largest in Olympic history (13 minutes, 27 seconds).

References

External links
Official Olympic Report
 

Men's 50 kilometre
Men's 50 kilometre cross-country skiing at the Winter Olympics